Jill Bakken (born January 25, 1977) is an American Olympic bobsledder who has competed since 1994.  As the driver, she and partner Vonetta Flowers won the gold medal in Bobsleigh at the 2002 Winter Olympics for the U.S. Bakken's best Bobsleigh World Cup season finish was second in the two-woman event in 1999–2000.  Bakken was a Specialist in the Utah Army National Guard and sponsored by the Army World Class Athlete Program at the time she won gold.

Bakken is a graduate of Lake Washington High School and an alumna of Eastern Washington University, transferring there in 2005. She has also attended the University of Utah and Oregon State University, playing one season of soccer as a defender at the latter.

Bakken is now a driving coach for the Canadian bobsleigh team and is married to Florian Linder who is also a coach for the Canadian bobsled team.

References

External links

Bobsleigh two-woman Olympic medalists since 2002
CNNSi.com February 20, 2002 article on Bakken and Flowers victory in the two-woman event.
ESPN.com February 19, 2002 article on Bakken's gold.
FIBT profile

1977 births
Living people
American female bobsledders
American military Olympians
Bobsledders at the 2002 Winter Olympics
Eastern Washington University alumni
Olympic gold medalists for the United States in bobsleigh
Sportspeople from Portland, Oregon
United States Army soldiers
University of Utah alumni
Utah National Guard personnel
Sportspeople from Kirkland, Washington
Medalists at the 2002 Winter Olympics
American women's soccer players
Soccer players from Oregon
Women's association football defenders
Oregon State Beavers women's soccer players
U.S. Army World Class Athlete Program